Andrew Guest is an American television writer. Guest's most notable works are episodes of Hope & Faith ("Faith Knows Squat", 2006) and 30 Rock ("Succession", 2008). Guest was also a member of the production staff on Hope & Faith and wrote episodes for Community ("Advanced Criminal Law", 2009; "Messianic Myths and Ancient Peoples", 2010; "Romantic Expressionism", 2010; "Advanced Dungeons & Dragons", 2011; "A Fistful of Paintballs", 2011).

He was nominated for the Writers Guild of America Award for Best Comedic Series at the February 2009 ceremony for his work on the third season of 30 Rock.

He also was involved with the production of Hawkeye. In 2022, he was hired as head writer for the upcoming Marvel Studios television series centered around Wonder Man. He is also set to write a film based on Community along with series creator Dan Harmon for Peacock.

References

External links

American television writers
American male television writers
Living people
Writers Guild of America Award winners
Place of birth missing (living people)
Year of birth missing (living people)